Numerous French vessels have borne the name Téméraire ("bold" or "reckless"). Note that several British ships have had the same name (although without the accents over the letter "e"), see HMS Temeraire.

Naval vessels
Twelve ships of the French Navy
 , a 54-gun ship of the line (1669–1694). 
 , a 50-gun ship of the line (1695–1718).
 , a West Indiaman (1726–1737).
 , a 74-gun ship of the line (1748–1794). She was captured by the English  at the Battle of Lagos on the 19 August 1759, and became . 
 , a cutter (1780–1784).
She took part in the bataille du 13 prairial an 2.
 , a cutter launched as Révolutionnaire and renamed in 1795. Recaptured the next month.
 Téméraire, a xebec.  captured her on 9 July 1795 and the British Royal Navy took her into service as HMS Transfer. She was sold in 1803.
 , a torpedo boat (1889–1911).
 , a torpedo boat (1911–1936), built for Argentina as San Juan, requisitioned for the war and renamed to Téméraire in 1914.
 , a torpedo boat (1944), sunk in a bombing in Toulon in August 1944.

Privateers
 Téméraire was a privateer of 10 guns and 50 men under the command of lieutenant de frégate Le Fer that  captured on 30 July 1782 off Cape Clear. She was nine days out of Brest, France, with dispatches for the combined fleet that she threw overboard, together with eight guns, before her capture.
 , a privateer aviso (1803–1811).
 , a privateer of two guns and 30 men that  captured on 29 September 1809 off Melazzo. She was four days out of Naples and had not made any captures.
 , a privateer schooner of 10 guns, six large swivel guns, and a crew of 35 men. She was a new vessel, three days out of Brest, and had taken no prizes when  captured her on 11 October 1810.
 , a privateer in 1812.

See also

Citations

External links 
 Les bâtiments ayant porté le nom de Téméraire

French Navy ship names